The Terrible class was a type of two 110-gun ships of the line, built to a design by Joseph-Marie-Blaise Coulomb.

Ships 
 Terrible
Builder: Toulon
Ordered: 23 October 1778
Launched: 27 January 1780
Fate:Broken up in 1804

 Majestueux
Builder: Toulon
Ordered: 20 April 1780
Launched: 17 November 1780
Fate:armed en flûte from 1807

References 

 
110-gun ship of the line classes
Ship of the line classes from France
Ship classes of the French Navy